Ramnath Paul (born 20 March 1942) was an Indian cricketer from Northern Punjab. He was a right-handed batsman and played first-class cricket for nearly five years.

First-class career

Paul made his First-class cricket debut in the 1963-64 season and played his last match in 1967-68.

References

External links 
 

1942 births
Indian cricketers
Living people
Northern Punjab cricketers